The 2021 CAF Women's Champions League UNAF Qualifiers is the 1st edition of the UNAF women's club football qualifier tournament organised by the UNAF for the women's clubs of association nations. This edition was held from 24 to 30 July 2021 in Berkane, Morocco. The winners of the tournament qualified for the 2021 CAF Women's Champions League final tournament held in Egypt. The tournament was won by AS FAR of Morocco.

Participating teams
The following three teams contested in the qualifying tournament. Wadi Degla SC from Egypt is the 2021 Egyptian League champions and he qualified automatically as the hosts of the final tournament. Due to the COVID-19 pandemic in Morocco, all the matches were played behind closed doors without any spectators.

Venues

Match officials
The following referees were chosen for the tournament.

Referees

Assistant referees

Qualifying tournament

Statistics

Goalscorers

Own goals
 Sana Yaakoubi (AS Banque de l'Habitat vs AS FAR)

References

External links 
2021 CAF Women's Champions League UNAF Qualifiers - unafonline.org

2021 CAF Women's Champions League
Women's Champions League
CAF